A private copying levy (also known as blank media tax or levy) is a government-mandated scheme in which a special tax or levy (additional to any general sales tax) is charged on purchases of recordable media. Such taxes are in place in various countries and the income is typically allocated to the developers of "content". (A distinction is sometimes made between "tax" and "levy" based on the recipient of the accumulated funds; taxes are received by a government, while levies are received by a private body, such as a copyright collective.)

Levy system may operate in principle as a system of collectivisation, partially replacing a property approach of sale of individual units.

History

Such levies were first introduced in Germany in the 1960s. With the advent of the audio cassette, legislators were persuaded that cassette recorders would decimate sales of records as friend after friend would then make copies of only one purchased album. Levies today are assessed on recordable compact discs, a form of media that did not exist when levies were first conceived. Although the bulk of unrecorded compact discs are actually used in the computing industry, they are still "taxed" to provide a revenue stream to the recording industry.

Levies are often considered a compensation for illegal file sharing. This is debatable, however: levies could be seen as not being an advance for fines, but rather, only intended to compensate for copies in the private sphere that are legally allowed in many jurisdictions. A notable exception in Europe is the UK, that does not allow private copies. But generally legislators allow private copies for two reasons: firstly, because otherwise the enforcement would be unfeasible for private reasons, and secondly because the administrative burden would be disproportionate.

European Union review 

On 2015-07-09 the European Parliament approved a non-binding resolution (Reda Report) asking a review of the levy in the European Union, building on previous resolutions and studies.

Questions on fairness
A difficulty that immediately arises is the practical impossibility of devising a mechanism for distributing the proceeds to copyright holders that is considered "fair" by all copyright holders and consumers. Implemented systems are typically restricted to music and may distribute the proceeds proportionally to a measurement of sales of CDs in music shops or amount of air-play on radio or the like. This ignores other distribution channels such as the Internet, and it disproportionally benefits popular artists and publishers of the related products. Fairer methods would arguably involve extensive sampling of purchasers to determine actual recording behaviour, or alternatively paying all musicians at a simple flat-rate (the preferred method will depend on one's political views).

While the prime purpose of levy systems is to compensate authors, some part of the collected money is also used for general cultural funding purposes. In Germany this is even required by law. It acknowledges the purpose of cultural diversity - which is not necessarily identical to free market effects. This funding is usually executed by the same entities (collecting societies) that distribute the levy money to individual authors. One may question however whether these entities are properly qualified to make culture policy.

Levy systems assume that all authors want to exploit their work for money. However this is not always true, especially on the internet. Many authors do not write to entertain, but to inform readers, listeners and viewers. Often their purpose is to reach the widest possible audience rather than make the maximum profit from the copyrighted work by itself. The discrepancy between reality and the assumption underlying a levy system is growing as "web 2.0" matures, with pervasive user-supplied content, from Wikipedia to YouTube.

A further problem is to find a proper tariff base for levies. Conceivably the levy may be a percentage of storage media sales price (e.g. 3% in the US). The implication of such a scheme is however that the author gets ever less as technology proceeds and becomes less expensive. But a price based on units of information (bits, or megabits) is not fair either, as for instance a DVD can be used to store a film, a computer game, a large amount of documents, or measurement data. The cost of producing a certain amount of bits widely varies by type of information. Measurement data is even not copyrighted at all. Yet in today's world of converging technology, storage media can be used for a wide range of purposes.

An implementation question that arises is whether the tax applies to any type of copyrighted work or is restricted to a limited field such as music. If it is restricted then the issue arises of how to collect the tax on media which can also be used for other purposes. The options include:

 Collecting the tax on all media, regardless of the end use, and ignoring the injustice to purchasers with non-covered uses.
 Allowing taxed and untaxed media to be sold, but with only the taxed media providing the copyright-relaxation benefits.
 Collecting the tax on all media but allowing purchasers to claim a refund for media applied to non-covered uses.

Contrary Fairness arguments
 Although these complexities make the systems of levies are far from perfect they do have some advantages related to fairness in that since there is compensation for private copying whereas in countries where there is no levies, there is a substantial amount of copying taking place without any due compensation being made.
 With respect to fairness in countries with the levy everyone is shares in the financial burden caused by the levy. In countries that do not have the levy, many people are copying music and never receive any reprimands while others are made an example and prosecuted. This is the similar argument that non-proponents to the levy system use to show fault. They advocate that if the levy cannot be precisely applied to the people that are private copying, it is a faulty system. Likewise, if one cannot reprimand all people that are copying illegally and not compensating the music industry, this is also a faulty system. One system over subscribes, the other undersubscribes, both have faults.
 Finally, those countries that do not have private copying laws are in fact making many of their citizens criminals. A law which makes potentially more than 50% of the population criminals does not seem to be a fair business practice. Lawyers rather than artists may well be the greatest beneficiaries in non-private copying countries. This argument assumes that private copying can only be allowed with a levy.

Legal effects
It is theorized that such levy may be linked to a corresponding relaxation of copyright law, by permitting the recording of copyrighted works on media for which the tax has been paid. However, there is little evidence to support this theory. On the contrary, lobbyists representing publishers and copyright holders have increased pressures to implement more restrictive laws, even on countries that have implemented private copying levy. In 2007, it was reported that International Intellectual Property Alliance put 23 of the world's 30 most populous countries into Priority Watch List, even though the United States, which was not in the list, has laws that are more liberal than the laws from the countries within the list.

Even when restricting levy system to devices that primarily play music, this itself creates loopholes that prevents collecting levies from cellphones, PDAs, and other all-in-one portable electronic devices. As a result, copyright holders will have to rely on even more laws to collect levy, and to increase rates of already levied product to recover perceived losses, which run against the political trends toward eliminating levy systems.

Regulations
Examples of countries operating such schemes:

Australia

Australia had a public levy on cassette tapes. The legislation establishing the levy was passed in 1989, challenged in the High Court of Australia in Australian Tape Manufacturers Association Ltd v Commonwealth. The court found the tax legal even though it went to private sources because it served a public purpose.

Copyright Amendment Act 1989 (Cth) introduced the Levy on blank tapes but was later repealed by Copyright Amendment (Re-Enactment) Act 1993 following the "blank tapes levy case" in the HCA in 1993.

Belgium
In Belgium a fee is charged on both blank media and recording equipment which is passed on to "Auvibel", which is in charge of distributing the funds. As of 1 February 2010, these fees are applicable for the following:

Equipment with integrated carrier:
MP3/MP4 player, cellphone with MP3/MP4 functionality:
 capacity is less or equal to 2GB: €1.00
 capacity is higher than 2GB and less or equal to 16GB: €2.50
 capacity is higher than 16GB: €3.00
TV, Hi-Fi, combined DVD writer and videorecorder, multifunctional DVD home cinema, set top box, multimediacenter:
 capacity is less or equal to 256GB: €3.30
 capacity is higher than 256GB and less or equal to 1TB: €10.75
 capacity is higher than 1TB: €13.00
Non-integrated equipment with integrated carrier:
DVD recorder, DVD reader, CD writer, videorecorder, DVD home cinema:
 capacity is less or equal to 256GB: €3.30
 capacity is higher than 256GB and less or equal to 1TB: €10.75
 capacity is higher than 1TB: €13.00
For the following equipment, without integrated carrier, that are not integrate-able in a computer and work standalone, have a fee of €2.00:
Hi-Fi with radio-cassette-CD
Combined DVD writer and videorecorder
Combined DVD reader and videorecorder
Portable radio-cassette recorder
Combined portable radio-cassette-CD
TV and combined DVD writer
DVD recorder
Cassette deck
Videorecorder
CD writer
MiniDisc writer
CD audio to MiniDisc writer
Digital carriers:
Memorystick, memorycard:
 capacity is less or equal to 2GB: €0.15
 capacity is higher than 2GB and less or equal to 16GB: €0.50
 capacity is higher than 16GB: €1.35
External hard drive:
 capacity is less or equal to 256GB: €1.30
 capacity is higher than 256GB and less or equal to 1TB: €6.75
 capacity is higher than 1TB: €9.00
 blank CD-R/RW, MiniCD-R/RW, MiniDVD-R/RW, MiniDisc, audiocassette DAT: €0.12/disc
 blank DVD+/-R/RW: €0.40/disc
Analogue carriers:
audiocassette, audiotape, videocassette 8mm: €0.12
videocassette: €0.40

Canada

A blank media levy was introduced in Canada in 1997, by the addition of Part VIII, "Private Copying", to the Canadian Copyright Act. The power to set rates and to set the distribution allocation is vested in the Copyright Board of Canada. The Copyright Board has handed the task of collecting and distributing the funds to the Canadian Private Copying Collective, which is a non-profit private organization.

In Canada:

 The levy applies to "blank audio recording media", such as CD-Rs.
 The levy is paid by importers and manufacturers of such media sold within Canada (and typically passed on to the retailer, and passed on to the purchaser).
 With the exception of the zero-rating exemption, the levy is collected regardless of the purchaser's end use of the media.
 The private copying levy, less CPCC operating costs, is distributed as per the Copyright Board's allocation as: 58.2% to eligible authors and publishers, 23.8% to eligible performers and 18.0% to eligible record companies.
 The Canadian Private Copying Collective has developed a method by which the proceeds are distributed to rights holders based on commercial radio airplay and commercial sales samples, ignoring radio/college airplay and independent record sales not logged by Soundscan. This method has been criticised as favouring major-label artists at the expense of the long-tail. As of September 7, 2007 over one hundred million dollars has been distributed.
 In conjunction with the levy, the Copyright Act allows individuals to make copies of sound recordings for their own private, non-commercial use. They may not distribute the copy.
 In 2005, the Federal Court of Appeal overruled a 2003 Copyright Board decision which had applied the blank media levy to MP3 players such as Apple Inc.'s iPod, on the basis that such devices did not qualify as "audio recording medium" as per the Copyright Act definition.  Before this, the proposed rates were C$2 for players with less than 1 GB of capacity, $15 for players up to 15 GB, and $25 for players 15 GB and over.
On February 12, 2007, CPCC asked the Copyright Board of Canada to reintroduce the levy of $5 to $75, this time onto the memory component of the digital audio recorders (such as MP3 players) in Canada. In addition, CPCC also proposed levies of $2 to $10 for memory cards (since withdrawn), 8 cent increases to CD, CD-R Audio, CD-RW Audio and MiniDiscs.  Certain parties objected to this tariff based on the 2005 Federal Court of Appeal precedent and brought a preliminary motion before the Copyright Board that would have prevented that part of the tariff application from being considered. The Copyright Board dismissed this preliminary motion in July 2007.
In September 2007, an application for judicial review was brought before the Federal Court of Appeal to appeal the Copyright Board's dismissal. On October 26, 2007, the court granted the Canadian Recording Industry Association's request to intervene in the private copying/iPod levy judicial review. Some argue that CRIA wanted to limit the scope of the private copying levy, given that it legalizes copying for the private use of the person making the copy, possibly regardless of whether the source is non-infringing or not.
In January 2008, the Federal Court of Appeal overturned the Copyright Board's July 2007 decision, stating that its previous ruling in the 2005 Canadian Private Copying Collective v. Canadian Storage Media Alliance case is dispositive authority for the proposition that "the Copyright Board has no legal authority to certify a tariff on digital audio recorders or on the memory permanently embedded in digital audio recorders."

Canada's current private copying levies are as follows: $0.29 per unit for CD-R, CD-RW, CD-R Audio, CD-RW Audio disks. The Pirate Party of Canada, or the PPCA, has called for the scrapping the levy, as there are plenty of non-piracy related uses for CDs and it is unjust to punish Canadians who don't use them for these purposes.

Finland
Finland had a blank media levy 1984-2015. From 2015 on the funds come directly from the state budget.

As of beginning of 2012, the fees were (in Euros):
 €0.005/min for analog audio tapes (e.g. €0.30 for a 60-minute cassette)
 €0.0076/min for analog video tapes (e.g. €1.37 for an E180 tape)
 €0.20 per disk for CD and MiniDisc (capacity: up to 1 GB)
 €0.60 per disk for DVD, DVD-RAM, DVD-R DL and DVD+R DL (capacity: from 1 GB to 10 GB)
 €1.20 per disk for Blu-ray Disc and HD DVD (capacity: over 10 GB to 25 GB)
 €1.80 per disk for Blu-ray Disc and HD DVD (capacity: over 25 GB)
 €4 to €36 depending on capacity of digital audio players or personal video recorders.
 €4, memory up to 512 MB
 €7, over 512 MB to 1 GB
 €10, over 1 GB to 20 GB
 €12, over 20 GB to 50 GB
 €15, over 50 GB to 150 GB
 €18, over 150 GB to 250 GB
 €25, over 250 GB to 500 GB
 €30, over 500 GB to 750 GB
 €36, over 750 GB
 €5 to €18 for external hard disk drives:
 €9, over 50 GB to 250 GB
 €12, over 250 GB to 1 TB
 €18, over 1TB to 3 TB
 smaller and bigger drives have no levies

There was no levy fee on mobile phones, computers, memory cards, game consoles, USB flash drives and  CDs/DVDs. VAT of 9% is added to the levies.

Germany

The world's first private copying system was created in Germany in 1965. It was a result of earlier successful litigation by GEMA against an audio equipment manufacturer in GEMA v. Grundig.

Luxembourg
Luxembourg is the only EU member state on the continent without a private copying levy, making it a popular "copying levy haven" for blank media buyers from countries such as France and Germany.

Netherlands
In the Netherlands a fee is charged on blank media which is passed on to "Stichting Thuiskopie" (Foundation Homecopy), which is in charge of distributing the funds. Fees for January 1, 2021 until December 31, 2023 are as follows:
PC / Laptop / notebook / server / mediacenter: €2,70
Tablet: €2,20
Smartphone: €7,30
Portable audio- / videoplayer: €2,10
Settopbox with hard disk / HDD-recorder: €3,80
E-reader: €1,10
External Hard Disk Drive (HDD), Solid State Disk (SSD) and USB flash drive >= 256 GB: €1,00
USB flash drive < 256 GB: €0,50
Wearables with storage capabilities: €0,60

Portugal

Portugal established a levy on CDs and DVDs in 1998.

Russian Federation
Article 1245 of Civil Code of Russian Federation "Remuneration for free reproduction of phonograms and audiovisual products for private purposes" ("Вознаграждение за свободное воспроизведение фонограмм и аудиовизуальных произведений в личных целях") mandates a fee, which is to be distributed in the following proportion: 40% to the authors, 30% to the singers, 30% to the manufacturers of the media. In practice, this fee had not been charged until after the Regulation of the Government of Russian Federation 829 from October 14, 2010, which mandated a uniform 1% tax on computers, blank optical disks, memory sticks, TVs, video and audio recorders, radios, mobile phones, etc. The controversial decision of the government to award the collected funds to the Russian Union of Rights-Holders for further distribution was criticized by the public and disputed in a lawsuit.

Sweden
In Sweden there is a fee called "privatkopieringsersättning" (private copy remuneration) earlier called "kassettersättning" (cassette tape remuneration) on storage media. The levy is handled by Copyswede. The extent of what is included in the copy levy has changed several times the past decade. In September 2019 the copy levy looks as follows https://www.copyswede.se/elektronikbranschen/produkter-och-ersattningsnivaer/:

 Computers with built-in storage memory, loose internal hard drives, external hard drives, tablets with built-in storage memory, gaming consoles with built-in storage memory and usb memories:
 > 2 GB - 80 GB 1 kr / GB
 > 80 GB 80 kr / pc  
 MP3 player, set-top box with built-in hard drive, DVD player with built-in hard drive, TV with built-in hard drive and other media players with built-in hard drive:
 1 - 320 GB 1 SEK/ GB
 > 320 GB 320 SEK / pc 
 Mobile phones with storage:
 For mobile phones with storage 3 SEK / GB 
 Recordable CDs and DVDs:
 CD-r All up to 900 MB 0.60 SEK
 CD-rw All up to 900 MB 0.95 SEK
 DVD-r / + r 4.7 GB 2.65 SEK
 DVD-rw / + rw 4.7 GB 4.25 SEK
 DVD frame 4.7 GB 4.25 SEK
 Dvd-r / + r double layer 8.5 GB 4.80 SEK 
 Analog audio cassettes (C cassettes), vhs cassettes (E cassettes), minidisc and cd-r audio (minute tariff):
 C-cassette 2.5 öre
 Minidisc 2 öre
 Cd-r audio 2 öre
 E-cassette (vhs) 2.5 öre

Switzerland
 Tax on recordable DVD (GT 4c):
 CHF 0.31 per recordable DVD
 CHF 0.88 per rewritable DVD
 CHF 0.33 per recordable Blu-Ray
 CHF 0.93 per rewritable Blu-Ray
 Tax on digital storage media packaged inside audio and audiovisual recording devices (GT 4d):
 Memory capacity up to 4 GB, CHF 0.63 per GB
 Memory capacity between 4 GB and 8 GB, CHF 0.572 per GB
 Memory capacity between 8 GB and 16 GB, CHF 0.332 per GB
 Memory capacity between 16 GB and 32 GB, CHF 0.2552 per GB
 Memory capacity over 32 GB, CHF 0.1992 per GB
 Compensation for the transfer of use of set-top box with memory and vPVR (GT 12):
 CHF 1.00 per month and subscriber if the following charges do not apply
 CHF 0.13 per month and subscriber if free or part of the basic package
 CHF 0.55 per month and subscriber for monthly subscription fee up to a max of CHF 6.50
 Tax on digital (recordable) memory in cell phones:
 Memory capacity up to 4 GB, CHF 0.108 per GB
 Memory capacity up to 8 GB, CHF 0.090 per GB
 Memory capacity up to 16 GB, CHF 0.072 per GB
 Memory capacity up to 32 GB, CHF 0.063 per GB
 Memory capacity up to 64 GB, CHF 0.052 per GB
 Memory capacity up to 128 GB, CHF 0.050 per GB

United States

Audio home recording in general
, as legislated by the Audio Home Recording Act of 1992, says that non-commercial copying by consumers of digital and analog musical recordings is not copyright infringement. Non-commercial includes such things as resale not in the course of business, perhaps of normal use working copies which are no longer wanted. It is unlikely to include resale of copies in bulk; Napster tried to use the Section 1008 defense but was rejected because it was a business.

From House Report No. 102-873(I), September 17, 1992: "In the case of home taping, the [Section 1008] exemption protects all noncommercial copying by consumers of digital and analog musical recordings" .

From House Report No. 102-780(I), August 4, 1992: "In short, the reported legislation [Section 1008] would clearly establish that consumers cannot be sued for making analog or digital audio copies for private noncommercial use".

The United States music industry administers the Audio Home Recording Act and foreign hometaping royalties for artists on US sound recordings as well as US record labels. These royalties were previously administered by the Alliance of Artists and Recording Companies (AARC) for Featured Artists and Copyright Owners until it ceased operations in 2021 and is now administered by SoundExchange, ASCAP/BMI/SESAC for writers, Harry Fox Agency for publishers, and The AFM/SAG-AFTRA Intellectual Property Rights Distribution Fund (Joint venture of AFM and SAG-AFTRA ) for non-featured artists. All societies also collect foreign remuneration for their respective funds.

Blank music CDs and recorders
 bars copyright infringement action and  provides for a royalty of 2% of the initial transfer price for devices and 3% for media. This only applies to CDs which are labeled and sold for music use; they do not apply to blank computer CDs, even though they can be (and often are) used to record or "burn" music from the computer to CD. The royalty also applies to stand-alone consumer-grade CD recorders, but not to professional CD recorders or CD burners used with computers. Most recently, portable satellite radio recording devices contribute to this royalty fund.

Thanks to a precedent established in a 1998 lawsuit involving the Rio PMP300 player, most MP3 players are deemed "computer peripherals" and are not subject to a royalty of this type in the U.S.

Currently, private copy royalties are generated in the US by the sale of "blank CDs and personal audio devices, media centers, satellite radio devices, and car audio systems that have recording capabilities."

United Kingdom
Currently there is no proper private copy exception in the United Kingdom, there is only a narrow exception regarding broadcast time-shifting (s70(1) of the Copyright, Designs and Patents Act 1988 (CDPA)).

On 1 June 2014, the UK implemented art. 5(2)b of the Infosoc Directive via the Copyright and Rights in Performance (Personal Copies for Private Use) Regulations 2014. This provided an exception limited to the personal use, to the owners of a personal copy and with the exclusion of indirectly commercial uses. It did not provide for compensation. The UK Government's view was that "levies or other compensation are neither required nor desirable in the context of a narrow provision that causes minimal harm. Levies are an unnecessary and inefficient tax on consumers. They are unfair to consumers in that they are payable regardless of the use to which a levied device (for example a hard disk) is put and regardless of whether a user has already paid for the copies they store on a device. Furthermore, particularly in the current economic climate, it is not right to extract more money from the pockets of hard pressed consumers." The British Academy of Songwriters, Composers and Authors (BASCA), the Musicians' Union, and UK Music challenged the introduction of these regulations, and brought an application for judicial review. Their application succeeded when, in June 2015, the High Court ruled that the regulations were unlawful because of a flawed impact assessment.

See also
Voluntary Collective Licensing
 Audio Home Recording Act

References

External links
Copyright Act of Canada
Copyright Board Canada
Canadian Private Copying Collective
CopySwede
The Finnish site for Private copying levy

Sales taxes
Taxation in the United States
Taxation in Canada
Copyright law
Taxation in Australia